The Central Counties Air Operations Unit was a joint consortium established to provide police aviation for Staffordshire Police and West Mercia Police. It operated a Eurocopter EC135 from Wolverhampton Halfpenny Green Airport in Bobbington, South Staffordshire.

The unit was replaced by the National Police Air Service on 1 January 2016.

See also
 Police aviation
 Police aviation in the United Kingdom

References

Police aviation units of the United Kingdom
Defunct organisations based in the United Kingdom
2016 disestablishments in England